The 1982 EuroHockey Club Champions Cup was the ninth edition of Europe's premier field hockey club competition. It was won by Dynamo Almaty, which became the first Soviet club winning the competition, in a final match against defending champions HC Klein Zwitserland. Barcelona's Real Club de Polo attained the 3rd place again.

1st division (Versailles)

Group stage

Group A
  HC Klein Zwitserland - 6 points
  Slough Hockey Club|Slough HC - 4 points
  Gladbacher HTC - 2 points
  SG Amsicora Cagliari - 0 points

Group B
  Dynamo Almaty - 5 points
  Real Club de Polo, Barcelona - 4 points
  Uccle Sport - 2 points
  Lisnagarvey HC - 1 point

Play-offs

Final
 Dynamo Almaty 4-3 HC Klein Zwitserland

3rd place
 Real Club de Polo, Barcelona 3-1 Slough HC

5th place
 Gladbacher HTC 5-2 Uccle Sport

7th place
 Lisnagarvey HC 2-1 SG Amsicora Cagliari

Standings
  Dynamo Almaty
  HC Klein Zwitserland (defending champions)
  Real Club de Polo, Barcelona
  Slough HC
  Gladbacher HTC
  Uccle Sport
  Lisnagarvey HC
  SG Amsicora Cagliari

 Ireland and Italy are relegated to 2nd Division for the 1983 Champions Cup.

2nd Division (Cardiff)

Standings
  Rock Gunners
  HC Amiens
  Cardiff HC
  Edinburgh HC
  HK Suboticanka
  Wien
  Partille SC
  Slagelse HC

  Gibraltar and  France are promoted to 1st Division for the 1982 Champions Cup.

References

See also
European Hockey Federation

EuroHockey Club Champions Cup
International field hockey competitions hosted by France
EuroHockey Club Champions Cup
EuroHockey Club Champions Cup
International field hockey competitions hosted by Wales